Amy Kavanagh is a British disability rights activist and advocate. Kavanagh is registered as blind, and was born with a complex visual impairment called ocular albinism, which has led to her vision loss. In 2017 she became more prominent as a disability campaigner, after she began writing online about her experiences navigating the world as a blind Londoner alongside her guide dog, Ava. Kavanagh also drove a social media campaign (known as #JustAskDontGrab) to encourage people to ask for consent before offering assistance. Kavanagh was a finalist in the Royal National Institute for the Blind See Differently Awards 2019, and her campaign was awarded the Campaign of the Year at the Transport for All Awards 2020.

Education and career 
Kavanagh graduated in 2017 with a PhD from King's College London, after achieving a first class degree at the University of Leeds in 2010. Her academic specialism was on the civil service in India in Bengal in the late nineteenth century. As Policy and Public Affairs Advisor for Sense she championed the rights of people living with complex disabilities, including those who are deafblind, at a local and national levels. Other experience includes roles at CLIC Sargent, fundraiser campaign Listen, and universities. Kavanagh currently works as a freelance disability consultant and an advocate for inclusion.

Media influence 
Kavanagh has written and spoken extensively about the impact on disabled people of social distancing and the ‘new normal’ including an interview on BBC Woman's Hour in June 2020. She has also written for publications including Huffington Post, Metro News, The Times Red Box, and iNews

During the global COVID-19 pandemic Kavanagh founded The Staying Inn, an accessible, inclusive online space for disabled and non disabled folk to stay connected during the crisis. The Staying Inn online community is run by disabled people for disabled people providing social events, training, support and wellbeing events.

Kavanagh is also known as a video gamer and streamer, under the name of 'Blind Button Masher' she advocates for greater accessibility in gaming including speaking at The 9th Global Accessibility Awareness Day (GAAD) conference in May 2020, and working with Ubisoft.

References

External links
 Website
 Cane Adventures (blog)
 Blonde Historian

Living people
Year of birth missing (living people)
Alumni of the University of Leeds

British disability rights activists
Blind activists
Alumni of King's College London